Amara Lakhous (born Algiers, 1970) is an Italian author, journalist and anthropologist of Algerian origin. He currently lives in New York City.

Early life
Lakhous was born in 1970 in Algiers, Algeria, in a Berber family with nine siblings. He graduated with a degree in philosophy from the University of Algiers. He also obtained a degree in cultural anthropology from the La Sapienza University in Rome with a thesis on the second generation of Muslim Arab immigrants in Italy.

Career
Lakhous wrote his first book, titled The Bedbugs and the Pirates, in 1993. It was written in the Algerian dialect of Arabic and published in a bilingual Arabic-Italian text in 1999. In 1994, Lakhous began work as a reporter for the Algerian national radio. Shortly thereafter, he left for Italy following death threats from Islamists. From 1995, he worked in Italy as a cultural mediator, interpreter, and translator in the field of immigration. In 2001, he wrote another Arabic-language novel based on his early years in Rome, titled How to be Suckled by the Wolf Without Getting Bit. He then rewrote the novel in Italian, publishing it as Clash of Civilizations Over an Elevator in Piazza Vittorio in 2006, which received critical and popular acclaim. The book has been translated into Dutch, English, and French and was made into a film in 2008.

Between 2003 and 2006, he was a journalist with the Adnkronos International news agency, based in Rome. Lakhous is an editor of a new imprint, Shark/Gharb, that publishes Arabic translations of contemporary European works.

He moved to New York City in 2014 and is currently a Visiting Professor at New York University.

Selected works
 
 
  (Clash of Civilizations Over an Elevator in Piazza Vittorio, translated by Ann Goldstein, Europa Editions, 2008)
  (Divorce Islamic Style, translated by Ann Goldstein, Europa Editions, 2012)
 
  (Dispute Over a Very Italian Piglet, translated by Ann Goldstein, Europa Editions, 2014)
  (The Prank of the Good Little Virgin of Via Ormea, translated by Antony Shugaar, 2016, Europa Editions)
 On the quest to write in a third language. Amara Lakhous dreams of green cheese and being reborn into New York City. May 4, 2016.  
 The Night Bird. Manshurat al-Hibr. 2019. "Arabic Fiction."

Honours
In 2006, Lakhous won the Flaiano prize as well as the Racalmere-Leonardo Sciascia prize for Clash of Civilizations Over an Elevator in Piazza Vittorio. He obtained the Prix des Libraires Algériens in 2008. His 2019 novel The Night Bird was longlisted for the International Prize for Arabic Fiction in 2021.

References

External links
 

1970 births
Algerian writers
Italian male writers
Italian anthropologists
Berber Algerians
People from Algiers
Living people
Berber writers
21st-century Algerian people